Sorbus species (rowans, whitebeams and allies) are used as food plants by the caterpillars of a number of Lepidoptera species (butterflies and moths). These include:

 Bucculatricidae leaf-miners:
 Bucculatrix bechsteinella
 Bucculatrix ulmella
 Coleophoridae
 Several Coleophora case-bearer species:
 C. anatipennella – leaves – recorded on European rowan (S. aucuparia), and possibly others
 C. cerasivorella – recorded on European rowan (S. aucuparia)
 C. spinella (apple-and-plum case-bearer)
 Geometridae
 Alcis repandata (mottled beauty) – recorded on rowans
 Cabera pusaria (common white wave) – recorded on rowans
 Chloroclysta truncata (common marbled carpet) – recorded on rowans
 Colotois pennaria (feathered thorn) – recorded on rowans
 Crocallis elinguaria (scalloped oak) – recorded on rowans
 Ectropis crepuscularia (engrailed) – recorded on rowans
 Epirrita autumnata (autumnal moth) – recorded on rowans
 Epirrita christyi (pale November moth)
 Erannis defoliaria (mottled umber)
 Eupithecia exiguata (mottled pug) – recorded on rowans
 Geometra papilionaria (large emerald) – recorded on rowans
 Gymnoscelis rufifasciata (double-striped pug) – recorded on rowans
 Hemithea aestivaria (common emerald) – recorded on rowans
 Odontopera bidentata (scalloped hazel) – recorded on rowans
 Operophtera brumata (winter moth)
 Opisthograptis luteolata (brimstone moth) – recorded on rowans
 Lymantriidae
 Euproctis chrysorrhoea (brown-tail)
 Euproctis similis (yellow-tail)
 Noctuidae
 Acronicta leporina (miller)
 Acronicta psi (grey dagger)
 Acronicta tridens (dark dagger) – recorded on rowans
 Amphipyra berbera (Svensson's copper underwing) – recorded on rowans
 Amphipyra pyramidea (copper underwing) – recorded on wild service tree (S. torminalis)
 Cosmia trapezina (dun-bar) – recorded on rowans
 Eupsilia transversa (satellite) – recorded on rowans
 Melanchra persicariae (dot moth) – recorded on rowans
 Orthosia gothica (Hebrew character) – recorded on rowans
 Nolidae
 Nola cucullatella (short-cloaked moth)
 Notodontidae
 Ptilodon capucina (coxcomb prominent) – recorded on rowans
 Saturniidae
 Pavonia pavonia (emperor moth)

External links 

Sorbus
+Lepidoptera